Port Bergé Airport  is an airport serving Port Bergé, a city in the Sofia Region of Madagascar.

Airlines and destinations

References

External links 
 

Airports in Madagascar
Sofia Region